"To Love Somebody" is a song written by Barry and Robin Gibb. Produced by Robert Stigwood, it was the second single released by the Bee Gees from their international debut album, Bee Gees 1st, in 1967. The single reached No. 17 in the United States and No. 41 in the United Kingdom.  The song's B-side was "Close Another Door".  The single was reissued in 1980 on RSO Records with "How Can You Mend a Broken Heart" as its flipside. The song ranked at number 94 on NME magazine's "100 Best Tracks of the Sixties". It was a minor hit in the UK and France. It reached the top 20 in the US. It reached the top 10 in Canada.

In a 2017 interview with Piers Morgan's Life Stories, Barry was asked "of all the songs that you've ever written, which song would you choose?" Barry said that "To Love Somebody" was the song that he'd choose as it has "a clear, emotional message". The song has been recorded by many other artists, including Janis Joplin, Roberta Flack, Lulu, James Carr, the Sweet Inspirations, Nina Simone, the Flying Burrito Brothers, Slobberbone and Jimmy Somerville.

Origins and lyrics

At the request of Robert Stigwood, the band's manager, Barry and Robin Gibb wrote "To Love Somebody", a soulful ballad in the style of Sam & Dave or The Rascals, for Otis Redding. Redding came to see Barry at the Plaza in New York City one night. Robin claimed that "Otis Redding said he loved our material and would Barry write him a song".

The Bee Gees recorded "To Love Somebody" at IBC Studios, London with "Gilbert Green" and "End of My Song" in April 1967 and released it as a single in mid-June.  Redding died in a plane crash later that year, before having a chance to record the song. 

Robin said, "Everyone told us what a great record they thought it was, Other groups all raved about it but for some reason people in Britain just did not seem to like it." Barry said, "I think the reason it didn't do well here was because it's a soul number, Americans loved it, but it just wasn't right for this country".

Barry Gibb explained in a June 2001 interview with Mojo magazine:

It was for Robert (Stigwood). I say that unabashedly. He asked me to write a song for him, personally. It was written in New York and played to Otis but, personally, it was for Robert. He meant a great deal to me. I don't think it was a homosexual affection but a tremendous admiration for this man's abilities and gifts.

Reception
Billboard described the single as a "smooth, easy beat ballad" that "should put them right back up there at the top of the Hot 100."

Personnel
 Barry Gibb – lead and backing vocals, rhythm guitar
 Robin Gibb – harmony and backing vocals
 Maurice Gibb – backing vocals, bass guitar
 Vince Melouney – lead guitar
 Colin Petersen – drums
 Bill Shepherd – orchestral arrangement

Charts

Weekly charts

Year-end charts

Michael Bolton version

American singer Michael Bolton covered and released it as a single from his 1992 album Timeless: The Classics. His version reached number 11 on the US Billboard Hot 100 and became his fourth single to peak at number two in Canada, his highest position in that country. It is also his highest-charting single in France, where it reached number seven.

Charts

Weekly charts

Year-end charts

Movie and TV appearances
"To Love Somebody" has been used in several movies including I Love You Phillip Morris, Y Tu Mamá También, Melody, The Wrong Man, My Entire Life, 50/50, Joy, and Glass Onion.

The Bee Gees' version appears in a 2019 TV commercial for Facebook Groups.

The Bee Gees' version also appears in a 2019 McDonald's television commercial.

The Bee Gees’ version also appears in the newly released, Baker 4 video.

Other cover versions
1967: Siluete recorded a Serbo-Croatian version, entitled "Voleti nekog", releasing it on the EP Kišu sam tražio (I Asked for Rain).
1968: The Sweet Inspirations recorded the song, which reached number 30 on the R&B charts.
1968: Gary Puckett & The Union Gap included this song on their Gold-selling debut album "Woman, Woman".
1969: Busty Brown released a reggae version of the song on the Upsetters label, catalog number US-308. 
1969: James Carr released this song as a single and reached number 44 on the R&B Charts.
1969: Nina Simone covered "To Love Somebody" released on her album To Love Somebody, which reached number 5 in the UK and became her second British hit single after "Ain't Got No, I Got Life". It also reached number 10 in the Dutch Charts, and number 17 in Ireland. Cash Box called her version an "excellent performance."
1977: Narvel Felts released the song, reaching number 22 on the Hot Country Singles chart.
1989: Billy "Crash" Craddock from Back on Track; peaked at number 91 on the RPM Country Tracks chart in Canada.
1990: Jimmy Somerville released a version that reached number 8 in the United Kingdom, becoming his most recent Top 10 entry in the UK. It also charted highly in several other countries, reaching number 7 in Ireland and attaining high positions in Austria, the Netherlands, and New Zealand.
2013: Michael Bublé covered this song for his eighth studio album To Be Loved, the album's fifth single. It reached number 13 in Poland.
2020: The Revivalists covered this song on their EP Made in Muscle Shoals.

References

External links
 

1967 songs
1967 singles
1992 singles
Songs written by Barry Gibb
Songs written by Robin Gibb
Bee Gees songs
Sweet Inspirations songs
Michael Bolton songs
Billy "Crash" Craddock songs
Nina Simone songs
Michael Bublé songs
Song recordings produced by Robert Stigwood
Polydor Records singles
Atco Records singles
Spin Records (Australian label) singles
Columbia Records singles